Jackson de Souza (born 1 May 1990), simply known as Jackson, is a Brazilian professional footballer who plays as a central defender for Sabah in Malaysia Super League.

Honours
Palmeiras
 Copa do Brasil: 2015

Bahia
Copa do Nordeste: 2017
Campeonato Baiano: 2018, 2019

Fortaleza
Campeonato Cearense: 2020, 2021

External links 
 

1990 births
Living people
Brazilian footballers
Association football defenders
Campeonato Brasileiro Série A players
Campeonato Brasileiro Série B players
São Paulo FC players
Sabah F.C. (Malaysia) players
People from  Cuiabá
Ituano FC players
Criciúma Esporte Clube players
Sport Club Internacional players
Clube Náutico Capibaribe players
Goiás Esporte Clube players
Sociedade Esportiva Palmeiras players
Esporte Clube Bahia players
Fortaleza Esporte Clube players
Sportspeople from Mato Grosso